The following is a list of Radio Disney Music Award winners and nominees for Best Music Group. There is also a Best Band Category.

Winners and nominees

2000s

2010s

References

Group